
Arnold Beverly is a Philadelphia man who rose to prominence during the legal appeals following the 1982 trial of Mumia Abu-Jamal. In 1999, Beverly signed an affidavit confessing to the murder of police officer Daniel Faulkner. Beverly swore that while acting as a hitman for the mob hired by corrupt Philadelphia police officers, he, not Abu-Jamal, killed officer Faulkner. 

Abu-Jamal's senior attorneys felt that Beverly was not credible, as no witnesses have testified to having seen Beverly at the scene, and advised Abu-Jamal against using Beverly to support his 1999 appeal.  This decision later became a divisive issue among Abu-Jamal's legal teams and supporters.

Beverly affidavit
Beverly's affidavit states that he and an unnamed second person were mob hitmen hired by corrupt Philadelphia police officers to kill officer Faulkner because of Faulkner's interference with graft and payoffs made to allow illegal activities in Philadelphia's Center City area.  He describes the killing and states that three police officers were within view, but says "I was not worried about the police being there since I believed that since I was hired by the mob to shoot and kill Faulkner, any police officers on the scene would be there to help me."

The affidavit further states that he escaped the scene by traveling three blocks on the underground Speedline, at which point he received further assistance from a police officer, then left the Center City area in a car that was waiting for him.

Defense decision
One of Abu-Jamal's attorneys, Partisan Defense Committee member Rachel Wolkenstein, found Beverly in 1999 and presented him and his affidavit to Abu-Jamal and the rest of the legal team.  Lead attorney Leonard Weinglass and legal strategist Daniel Williams advised Abu-Jamal that Beverly was neither credible nor an asset to his case while Wolkenstein and her colleague Jon Piper argued in favor of Beverly's testimony.  Abu-Jamal decided to take the advice of his more senior attorneys and not present Beverly in the appeal process, leading Wolkenstein and Piper to resign in protest.

In 2001, Williams published Executing Justice: An Inside Account of the Case of Mumia Abu-Jamal, in which he says he "wasn't about to embarrass myself by running with such a patently outrageous story on the most visible death-penalty case in the world."  He also says that Abu-Jamal decided not to use Beverly because Abu-Jamal was "far too honorable to propagate a lie upon which to build a case for his freedom."  Although largely favorable to Abu-Jamal, the book resulted in Mumia firing both Williams and Weinglass from the defense team.

Change of strategy
Abu-Jamal's next legal team revived the Beverly affidavit.  Claiming it had been hidden from them, on 4 May 2001 they petitioned a federal court to have Arnold Beverly deposed as a witness.  However, under US law, a capital case defendant cannot introduce evidence during an appeal which he has known about and rejected more than a year earlier, and on 19 July 2001, Judge William Yohn denied the petition.
(In December of that year Judge Yohn overturned Abu-Jamal's death sentence but upheld the conviction for murder.)
A further petition to the Pennsylvania Supreme Court to hear from Beverly, based on the claim of ineffective counsel by Weinglass and Williams, was denied on 8 October 2003 by Justices Eakin and Nigro.

References

External links
 Video - Arnold Beverly reads from his affidavit

Year of birth missing (living people)
Living people
Mumia Abu-Jamal